Schulberg (meaning "synagogue mountain") is a surname. Notable persons with that surname include:

 B. P. Schulberg (1892–1957), American film producer and film studio executive
 Budd Schulberg (1914–2009), American screenwriter and novelist
 Jay Schulberg (1939–2005), American advertising executive

Jewish surnames
German-language surnames
Yiddish-language surnames